Hugh Cook (9 August 1956 – 8 November 2008) was a cult author whose works blend fantasy and science fiction. He is best known for his series The Chronicles of an Age of Darkness.

Biography
Hugh Walter Gilbert Cook was born in Essex, England in 1956. After spending his early childhood in England he moved to Ocean Island (now Banaba Island in Kiribati). His experiences of English castles and of life on an equatorial island later influenced his writing.

He moved to, and was educated in New Zealand. His first novel, Plague Summer was published when he was 24 in 1980.

Between 1986 and 1992 he wrote the ten-novel series The Chronicles of an Age of Darkness. Disappointing sales prevented the publication of further volumes (up to 60 were planned).

In 1997 he moved to Japan, and lived in Yokohama with his wife and daughter and taught English.

He subsequently published mainly online, through his site, Zen Virus. His online works include poetry, short stories, "flash fiction", and several novels.

In 2005 he underwent chemotherapy and radiation treatment for cancer in the form of non-Hodgkin's lymphoma. He wrote a medical memoir, Cancer Patient, telling of this experience.

Following a relapse, Hugh Cook died on 8 November 2008, in the hospice in Auckland.

Bibliography

Chronicles of an Age of Darkness series

The Wizards and the Warriors – (aka Wizard War ) 1986
The Wordsmiths and the Warguild – (aka The Questing Hero and The Heroes Return (2 volumes)) 1987
The Women and the Warlords – (aka The Oracle ) 1987
The Walrus and the Warwolf – (the first half was published in the US as Lords of the Swords) 1988
The Wicked and the Witless – 1989
The Wishstone and the Wonderworkers – 1990
The Wazir and the Witch – 1990
The Werewolf and the Wormlord – 1991
The Worshippers and the Way – 1992
The Witchlord and the Weaponmaster – 1992

The series broadly tells the story of the events leading to the end of a dark age.  The idea for the series began with an ambitious outline for a series of twenty novels. This would have been followed by two equally long series, The Chronicles of an Age of Wrath, and The Chronicles of an Age of Heroes. This sixty-volume scheme ended with the publication of the tenth volume because of disappointing sales.

Other novels
Plague Summer
The Shift
This describes a postnuclear world where orange intelligent reptilian extraterrestrials known as the Spang have conquered the Earth through the use of a device called the Shift, which controls movement through space and time and can alter history.  They are in league with Iridian Troy, the most powerful human on Earth, who has an overprotective attitude towards his daughter.  He is opposed by his guilt-ridden over-intellectual employee Gabriel Arkhangel and his daughter's lover Clive Sendarka, whom he pursues using all the resources available to the human race.  Humans are regularly exported to a slave colony known as Deep Six, which is far out in interstellar space.

Oceans of Light series
West of Heaven
East of Hell
North of Paradise
A fantasy trilogy that Cook finished in the 1990s, set in Chalakanesia.

To Find and Wake the Dreamer
A fast-moving fantasy novel, written on an adult level, about the war on terror. In the city state of Oolong Morblock, where a certain proportion of the people have a natural ability to cause themselves to explode, in effect making them potential suicide bombers, Ibrahim Chess tries to find the middle road: to steer a course of moderation and sanity in a world which is going mad, and where the civil peace is threatened by the increasingly intolerant fanaticism of the conflict between the minority group to which Ibrahim belongs, the astrals, and the city state's dominant group, the norms. Published in 2005.

Bamboo Horses
A murder mystery with fantasy elements set in the land of Nizon, where people eat with scissors rather than with chopsticks. Fantasy in a modern environment complete with computers and cellphones. Business manager Ken Udamana, a husband and a father of two, believes that someone is planning to murder him and takes a shot at find out who. This novel contains some violence and touches on the subject of an adulterous relationship.

Short stories
 "Consenting Adults" 1988
 "The Kidney Bean Diet" 1998
 "Consequences" 1998
 "Heroes of the Third Millennium" Fantasy & Science Fiction, December 1998, Vol. 95, Iss. 6, p. 99.
 "Outing" 1998
 "Night on Bear Mountain" 1999
 "An Alien in Japan" 1999
 "Howie Glenst and the Woman Made From Glass" 1999
 "The Succubus" 1999
 "The Earth is Flat" 1999
 "Her Mint-Green Breath" 1999
 "Remembering Nagasaki" 1999
 "Mountaineering Complex" 1999
 "Machine Readable" 1999
 "Golf Course" 1999
 "Sweetness and Light" 2000
 "Locked Out" 2000
 "Night in the Month of Madness" 2000
 "In the Month of Lombok" 2000
 "Marooned on Footbone" 2000
 "Lost in the Moid" Challenging Destiny No. 10, July 2000 (St. Marys, Canada, ISSN 1206-6656) (pp 7–27).
 "Gally Smith and the Massacre of the Orcs" 2000
 "Boxes" 2000
 "Portrait of a Woman with her Hair on Fire" 2000
 "The Invention of Stones" 2000
 "Basque" 2000
 "Other Lives" 2000
 "Swiss Toys" 2001
 "Limbo Larry" 2001
 "Gap Music" 2001
 "That Nightmare Known as Life" 2001
 "Wet Leaves on the Track" 2001
 "Hunting Andrew" 2001
 "A Totally Ordinary Young Woman" 2001
 "The Warden of Jestabel Zee" 2001
 "Pogy Bobs and the Hyena of Death" 2001
 "Golgo Molgo" 2001
 "The Trial of Edgar Allan Poe" 2002
 "Cultural Correctness" 2002
 "Flowers for the Lady" 2002
 "Views of Texas" 2002
 "Bad Sex" 2003
 "Patriots" 2003
 "The Suicide Bomber" 2003
 "Quilting" 2003
 "UFO Invasion – the Truth about Alien Abductions!!" 2003
 "Acorns" 2003
 "The Transfer of Patient Twenty-Seven" 2003
 "Live on Channel 10" 2003
 "On the Wings of a Cockroach" 2003
 "The Man on the Balcony" 2003
 "Sign on the Dotted Line" 2003
 "Life on Planet Earth" 2003
 "Saint George and Ibrahim" 2003
 "Cherry Normal" 2003
 "The Rat" 2003
 "Upgrade" 2003
 "A Subway Ride" 2003
 "The Wrath of Babril Hestek" 2003
 "Too Far From Home" 2003
 "The Angel of the Seventh Apocalypse" 2003
 "The Triumph of Japanese English" 2003
 "The Naked Succubus Sex Slave Murders" 2003
 "Harriet's Armpit" 2003
 "House Hunting" 2003
 "The Orc's Armpit" 2003
 "His Name Was Mac" 2003
 "The Magniloquator" 2003
 "Honeymoon" 2004
 "You're in my Body" 2004
 "The Executed Man" 2004
 "The Wind in his Mouth" 2004
 "Jorgelvace" 2004
 "Fulfillable Wishes" 2004
 "Yenlow's Renewal 52" 2004
 "Grapefruit Perfume Bicycle Birthmark" 2004
 "Escape from Hell" 2004
 "Implantation" 2004
 "Shotgun Al's Last Picnic" 2004
 "Maggots" 2004
 "The Therapy of the Great God Mulchagola" 2004
 "Lost in his Bedroom" 2004
 "Daddy's Little Girl" 2004
 "A Better Life" 2004
 "Suicide Hotel" 2004
 "Newlyweds" 2004
 "Burning Louty" 2004
 "Hot Cardboard" 2004
 "Santa Claus, Sex Criminal" 2004
 "Eating Jesus Christ" 2005

Chronicles of an Age of Darkness stories
 "Invasion of the Chickens" 1999
 "Vorn the Gladiator" 2000
 "A Pilgrimage to Plaka Kalada" 2003
 "The Secret History of Lord Dreldragon" 2003
 "The Dragon Zenphos" 2003

Oolong Morblock stories
 "Life and Death in Oolong Jalabar" 2000
 "Astral Talent" 2001
 "Life and Death in Oolong Morblock" 2003
 "A Genie at Work" 2003

Chalakanesia stories
 "The Ghosting of Heineman Jubiladilia" 2000
 "Diving on the Wreck" 2002

References

External links
Hugh Cook Reddit, The Hugh Cook Fan Subreddit
Hugh Cook, the official site of Hugh Cook

Chronicles of an Age of Darkness a fan site
Hugh Cook Fanfiction site
Great Science Fiction & Fantasy Works
BSFA Index of Reviews
Colin Smythe Bibliography
Most recent blog posts

1956 births
2008 deaths
British fantasy writers
British science fiction writers
British emigrants to Kiribati
British emigrants to New Zealand
British emigrants to Japan
Deaths from cancer in New Zealand
Deaths from non-Hodgkin lymphoma
British male novelists
20th-century British novelists
20th-century British male writers